Lake Moore is a lake located at Moorebank and Chipping Norton, New South Wales. It is part of the Georges River system. The lake is separated into a northern and southern section. The north half of the lake is artificial, while the south half is natural. The lake also contains several wildlife islands.

Recreation 
The Lake Moore Walk starting at Chauvel Park, follows the lake's scenic foreshore to Haigh Park. The 45-minute return trip is approximately 3.2 km and is mainly flat and paved.  Watercraft are permitted on Lake Moore however, a strict speed limit of eight knots applies.

References 

Lakes of New South Wales